The Senate Ukraine Caucus is a bipartisan caucus of the United States Senate that was inaugurated on February 9, 2015 in Washington, D.C. Its mission is "to strengthen the political, military, economic, and cultural relationship between the United States and Ukraine."

Its counterpart in the House of Representatives is the Congressional Ukrainian Caucus, which was established in 1997 and consists of 41 representatives.

Members
Senators Dick Durbin (D-IL) and Rob Portman (R-OH) were the caucus' two Co-Chairs until Portman's . Senators Chris Murphy (D-CT), Sherrod Brown (D-OH), Jeanne Shaheen (D-NH), and Ron Johnson (R-WI) are the caucus' Vice-Chairs.

The Senate Ukraine Caucus consists of 16 senators (9 Democrats and 7 Republicans):

Former members

After 2022 elections:
 Sen. Jim Inhofe (R-OK) (resigned)
 Sen. Rob Portman (R-OH) (retired)
 Sen. Pat Toomey (R-PA) (retired)

After 2018 elections:
 Sen. Joe Donnelly (D-IN) (lost reelection)
 Sen. Bill Nelson (D-FL) (lost reelection)

After 2016 elections:
 Sen. Kelly Ayotte (R-NH) (lost reelection)
 Sen. Mark Kirk (R-IL) (lost reelection)

Relevant legislation
 United States International Programming to Ukraine and Neighboring Regions (S.R. 2183), introduced on March 27, 2014
 Ukraine Freedom Support Act of 2014 (S.R. 2828), introduced on September 16, 2014

See also
 Ukrainian Congress Committee of America, a non-profit organization representing the interests of Ukrainian-Americans

References



Caucuses of the United States Congress
Ukraine–United States relations
2015 establishments in Washington, D.C.